Peter Brotherton Spurrier (1942 – 2005) was an officer of arms at the College of Arms in London. He was appointed Portcullis Pursuivant of Arms in Ordinary in 1981 and York Herald of Arms in Ordinary in 1992. He retired from the College of Arms in May 1993.

See also
Heraldry
Herald

1942 births
2005 deaths
English officers of arms